Pseudomeritastis decora is a species of moth of the family Tortricidae. It is found in Bolivia.

The length of the forewings is about 10 mm. The forewings are light grey with ferruginous-brown markings, edged and in part transversely strigulated (finely streaked) with dark brown. The hindwings are white and slightly creamy.

References

Moths described in 1966
Euliini